The Waiwawa River is the longest river on the Coromandel Peninsula, in the Waikato Region of New Zealand's North Island. It flows initially northwest from its sources on the slopes of Mount Rowe before turning northeast to reach the southern end of the Whitianga Harbour.

See also
List of rivers of New Zealand

References

Thames-Coromandel District
Rivers of Waikato
Rivers of New Zealand